Misery was an Australian death metal band from Brisbane, Queensland. Since forming in 1991, the band has released four albums and an EP. The band split in 2005, but has reformed three times for an East Coast Australian tour in support of final album in 2009, to support Taake on an Australian tour in 2017 and for the 30th Anniversary of their debut album.

Background 
The group was formed in 1991 by bassist Damon Robinson and guitarist Scott Edgar, who had both been members of earlier Brisbane groups Guardian, Northwinds, Savage, A.I.M. and Black Magic. The band's first line-up featured Robinson, Edgar, drummer Anthony Dwyer, Northwinds guitarist Brad Allen, and vocalist Darren Goulding. Allen was soon replaced by Laszlo Khaninghinis, and the band recorded two demos in 1992 – Sorting of the Insects and Astern Diabolus before releasing their first album A Necessary Evil in 1993.

Soon after the album's release, Misery's reputation as a heavy act was immediately established, and the band undertook its first national tour in support of Pungent Stench. Goulding was fired from the group not long after the tour, to be replaced by former Mausoleum vocalist Moises Contreras. Goulding would later go on to front Sydney band Sulkus, Wagga Wagga death metal group Manticore, and Sydney nu-metal outfit Art Imitates Crime. In 1994, the band released the Insidious EP with Contreras on vocals; its accompanying video clip Torn was banned from television airplay. The EP was recorded at Red Zeds studios between March and April of that year. Supports with Deicide and Morbid Angel, and an appearance at the Big Day Out festival soon followed. Contreras' stay with the band would also be short-lived, and after his departure Robinson decided to take up the band's vocal duties himself. Contreras would go on to form melodic death metallers Sakkuth.

In 1997, Misery signed to Sydney metal label Warhead Records and released their second album Revel in Blasphemy, which is regarded by many as Misery's heaviest recorded work. More touring followed, with the band playing Metal for the Brain. Another album's worth of material was set for release by 1998, but due to Warhead Records ceasing operation at the time, third album Curses would not see release until 2000 through Venomous Records.

Throughout the 2000s, the members of Misery began to busy themselves with other projects. Edgar played in a group called Soundsurgery, while Kananghinis formed punk rock group Greensteam, and Robinson recorded a demo with doom metallers Cardinal Sin. All the members of Misery also began a Motörhead cover group called White Line Fever, which they would play sets of at their own shows. After a tour of New Zealand in 2001, Kananghinis left Misery to focus on Greensteam full-time. The band continued as a three-piece until 2005, when Robinson left Australia to live in the United States. Misery's fourth and final album On Demon Wings was released through Brisbane label Obsidian Records in 2007. In 2005 Edgar formed The Dead, but left in 2008 after one album, and later formed a new band with Dwyer called Laceration Mantra. Misery regrouped in March 2009 for an East Coast tour in support of On Demon Wings with Adelaide doom metal group Mournful Congregation.

In 2017, Misery reformed for a "one off" Brisbane reunion show in support of Norwegian black metal band, Taake.

For the 30th Anniversary of their 1993 album A Necessary Evil, Misery has announced numerous Australian shows including a slot in the Canberra Metal Fest, a Brisbane Show and a show at Southport. The band announced that they will be preforming the album A Necessary Evil in full at the Brisbane concert for the first and last time.

Line-up
 Damon Robinson – bass and vocals
 Scott Edgar – guitar
 Glen Phillips – guitar (2017)
 Ant Dwyer – drums

Former members
 Brad Allen – guitar (1991)
 Laszlo Kananghinis – guitar (1991–2001)
 Darren Goulding – vocals (1991–1993)
 Moises Contreras – vocals (1994)

Discography
 A Necessary Evil (1993) Velvet Urge
 Insidious (1994) Valve
 Revel in Blasphemy (1997) Warhead
 Curses (2000) Venomous
 On Demon Wings (2007) Obsidian

References

Musical groups established in 1991
Musical groups disestablished in 2017
Australian heavy metal musical groups
Australian death metal musical groups
Musical groups from Brisbane
Australian musical trios